Dmitry Koltakov (born 6 September 1990) is a Russian three times ice speedway individual world champion and five times World Team champion.

Career
Koltakov won the Individual Ice Speedway World Championship titles in 2015 and 2017. His third title came when he won the 2018 Individual Ice Racing World Championship in dominating fashion. He won nine of the ten rounds and was a clear 35 points ahead of his nearest rival Daniil Ivanov.

He also won the Team Ice Racing World Championship titles with Russia on five occasions in 2013, 2014, 2016, 2017 and 2018.

References

1990 births
Living people
Russian speedway riders
Ice Speedway World Champions